The Gatewood House is a historic house at 235 Pine Bluff Street in Malvern, Arkansas.  It is a two-story wood-frame structure, roughly rectangular in plan, with a gambrel roof and weatherboard exterior.  The gambrel roof is unusual in that the upper level slightly overhangs the steeper lower parts.  The front-facing gable rests above a polygonal bay window on the left and a recessed porch on the right, which is supported by clustered Tuscan columns.  Built in 1905, the building represents a well-executed example of a vernacular interpretation of the Shingle style of architecture.

The house was listed on the National Register of Historic Places in 1992.

See also
National Register of Historic Places listings in Hot Spring County, Arkansas

References

Houses on the National Register of Historic Places in Arkansas
Shingle Style architecture in Arkansas
Houses completed in 1905
Houses in Hot Spring County, Arkansas
National Register of Historic Places in Hot Spring County, Arkansas
Individually listed contributing properties to historic districts on the National Register in Arkansas
Buildings and structures in Malvern, Arkansas
1905 establishments in Arkansas